Stijepo Njire (born 14 March 1991) is a Croatian retired footballer who played as a midfielder.

Club career
He had a spell at Austrian fourth-tier side SV Donau in 2014.

FK Železiarne Podbrezová
Njire made his Fortuna Liga debut for Železiarne Podbrezová against Tatran Prešov on 18 February 2018.

References

External links
 FK Železiarne Podbrezová official club profile
 1. SC Znojmo official club profile
 
 Futbalnet profile

1991 births
Living people
Sportspeople from Dubrovnik
Association football midfielders
Croatian footballers
1. SC Znojmo players
FK Železiarne Podbrezová players
Austrian Landesliga players
Czech National Football League players
Slovak Super Liga players
Croatian expatriate footballers
Expatriate footballers in Austria
Croatian expatriate sportspeople in Austria
Expatriate footballers in the Czech Republic
Croatian expatriate sportspeople in the Czech Republic
Expatriate footballers in Slovakia
Croatian expatriate sportspeople in Slovakia